The Gaithersburg Giants are a baseball team in the Cal Ripken Collegiate Baseball League. They play in Gaithersburg, Maryland at Criswell Automotive Field. They joined the league in 2013.

Notable players

Eric Brodkowitz, Israeli-American baseball pitcher for the Israel National Baseball Team

References

External links
 

Amateur baseball teams in Maryland
Fan-owned baseball teams
Gaithersburg, Maryland
2013 establishments in Maryland
Baseball teams established in 2013